XXL is a television channel in France that is dedicated to pornography and erotica. Created in March 1996 and transmitted by the AB Sat satellite, it was at the time the first French channel to broadcast pornography every evening. Nowadays, it is available on every cable and satellite distributor as an option channel.

XXL starts its programming at 22:30 CET with either an erotic film, or a talk show, sometimes hosted by former pornographic film actresses. Starting at midnight, it broadcasts two pornographic films, of which the second is a repeat broadcast from the previous week. It broadcasts a gay movie every Tuesday and an amateur film every Wednesday. At the time of the debate on the protection of the minors with respect to the images in pornographic matter of 2002, the channel was strongly criticized because half of pornographic films on French television, were on this channel.

On 24 December 2013, XXL was sold to Thematic Netherlands BV, an association comprising an AB group executive and the Marc Dorcel (minority shareholder) group is entrusted with the editorial management of the channel and its VOD services.

References
 Henley, Jon.  Pornography forms French children's views on sex. An alleged teenage gang rape 'like some kind of virtual game' underlines survey's fears. The Guardian – 25 May 2002

Specific

External links
Official site

Television stations in France
Pornographic television channels
Television pornography
Television channels and stations established in 1996
1996 establishments in France